J. Russell Findlay (born May 4, 1965) is an American businessman, philanthropist and an advertising and marketing executive. He is currently the Global Chief Marketing Officer at Hiscox, an international specialist insurer as well as a small business owner and a Managing Director of a non-profit organization.

Career
Russell Findlay is currently the Global Chief Marketing Officer at Hiscox, and was the first chief marketing officer in the history of Major League Soccer. Prior to MLS, Findlay worked for PepsiCo alongside American Advertising Federation Hall of Fame inductee Alan Pottasch. He worked at PepsiCo under Chairmen Roger Enrico, Steven Reinemund and Indra Nooyi. While at PepsiCo, Findlay helped launch SoBe Mr. Green soft drink, Sierra Mist and Sierra Mist Free, including helping produce a TV commercial putting soccer greats Freddy Adu and Pelé together for the first time.

Findlay also launched Pepsi Max (North America) while at PepsiCo. He was responsible for negotiating an on-air integrated marketing sponsorship deal with ABC's Duel (U.S. game show).

Findlay started his career at Unilever as a territory sales rep before moving to new business innovation then into their brand marketing department at Lever House.

Memberships and associations

Findlay serves on the following:
 Board of Directors of the Association of National Advertisers 
 Board of Directors of the Business Marketing Association of New York.
 Chairman of Sponsorship and Events Committee, of the Association of National Advertisers
 Member of the Advertising Self-Regulatory Council's National Advertising Review Board

Honors and awards

He has earned two Effie Awards for effective advertising., several Financial Communication Society Awards including Best in Show, a Global Ace award, the CMO Club Growth Award  the ANA's B2B Marketer of the Year  and was named as one of 2014's 30 most influential marketers in the world. Findlay has served as a final round judge of the Effie Awards, the ANA's B2 awards, the BMA Global Ace Awards and the FCS Portfolio Awards 

In 2019, Findlay was awarded the FCS Jamie DePeau Leadership Award from the Financial Communications Society. The objective of the Jamie DePeau Leadership award is to honor, every year, FCS members who, through personal and professional contributions to their communities, serve as living examples of the selfless, inspirational leadership that Jamie DePeau embodied during her career in financial services marketing.

Publications and teaching 

Additionally, Findlay has authored or has been featured or quoted in a number of publications including:

Books: 
 The Future of Marketing, by Nick Johnson, 
 Target2000,

Video:
 The Association of National Advertisers, Advertising Education Foundation CMO series

Podcasts: 
 CMO.com "In Financial Services, Storytelling is more important than ever"

Print: 
 Forbes
 Inc Magazine
 Adage 
 Adweek 
 ChiefMarketer.com 
 B-to-B Marketer
 QualityFinancialMedia.com
 Brandchannel.com 
 Carrier Management

Findlay is a frequent guest lecturer at business schools. He has lectured and presented at Harvard Business School, Yale School of Management, Columbia Business School, the University of Pennsylvania's Wharton School of Business, Indiana University Bloomington's Kelley School of Business, SUNY Oswego and Skidmore College among others. He is also a frequent presenter at industry conferences on marketing and advertising topics.

Education
His undergraduate degree is in marketing from SUNY Oswego, where he is on the board of their School of Business. He also holds an MBA with a concentration in marketing and advertising from Xavier University, and a Financial Technology certificate from Massachusetts Institute of Technology.

Personal
Findlay is related to the advertising and media couple, New York Post editor Joseph Cookman and his wife Ladies Home Journal editor Mary Bass.

He also runs the Findlay Family Foundation, a non-profit 501c3 organization providing college scholarships to high school seniors from underprivileged school districts.

Findlay is also a US Soccer Referee.

References

External links 

1965 births
Living people
State University of New York at Oswego alumni
Xavier University alumni
American advertising executives
Philanthropists from New York (state)
PepsiCo people
Unilever people
Major League Soccer executives
20th-century American businesspeople